The Ellendale Opera House Block is located on Main St. in Ellendale, North Dakota

The three-story brick structure  was built in 1908 and had its grand opening in 1909. It was designed by George Issenhuth with some elements of Chicago School architecture. The main part of the auditorium floor was for seating where plays and shows were held. The second story had offices. 

It is significant architecturally with its community, whose older architecture has been diminished by fires. It was listed on the National Register of Historic Places in 1992.

References

External links
Ellendale Opera House  website

Chicago school architecture in the United States
Theatres completed in 1908
National Register of Historic Places in Dickey County, North Dakota
Opera houses on the National Register of Historic Places in North Dakota
1908 establishments in North Dakota